Air Atlantique was an airline based at Coventry Airport operating a number of classic aircraft, both for passenger operation and for cargo transportation. They operated both the Douglas DC-3 and Douglas DC-6 but did also have a few aircraft on wet lease such as some ATR-42s and ATR-72s. Many of their remaining classic aircraft were donated to Classic Flight for display at airshows. Two of their DC-3s are currently leased by Pollution Control but will be returned to Classic Flight (Classic Air Force) in due course. One DC-6 was converted to a restaurant.

History 
The Air Atlantique Group started as an air taxi operation in 1969 under the name of General Aviation Services, based in Jersey, Channel Islands. The Air Atlantique name was adopted in June 1977 when freight charter flights were launched with Douglas DC-3 aircraft. The Group moved to its base in Coventry in December 1985. Between then and the late 1990s, it expanded its operations to create pilot training facilities, aircraft engineering shops, survey and aerial reconnaissance work and other aviation-related activities. Between 1990 and 1994 scheduled passenger services were operated from the Channel Islands as Air Corbiere. Highland Airways was established in 1991 at Inverness Airport. 
Atlantic Airlines, which previously operated all-cargo airline activities within the Air Atlantique Group, was the subject of a management buy-out in July 2004 and now operates as an independent company. Other parts of the Group were similarly spun off as owners Mike Collett and James Foden approached retirement. Atlantic Flight Training and Atlantic Reconnaissance (now renamed RVL Aviation) have also become independent businesses.

Air Atlantique later operated a number of historic aircraft as the Classic Air Force. It also owned CFS Aeroproducts and managed various minority investments for its owners.

See also
 RVL Aviation
 List of defunct airlines of the United Kingdom

References

External links

Air Atlantique 
RVL Group
The Cloudmaster Six 

Defunct airlines of the United Kingdom
Airlines established in 1977
1977 establishments in England